Maimuna is a genus of funnel weavers first described by Pekka T. Lehtinen in 1967.

Species
 it contains seven species:
Maimuna bovierlapierrei (Kulczyński, 1911) — Lebanon, Israel
Maimuna cariae Brignoli, 1978 — Turkey
Maimuna carmelica Levy, 1996 — Israel
Maimuna cretica (Kulczyński, 1903) — Greece, Crete
Maimuna inornata (O. Pickard-Cambridge, 1872) — Greece, Syria, Israel
Maimuna meronis Levy, 1996 — Israel
Maimuna vestita (C. L. Koch, 1841) — Eastern Mediterranean

References

Agelenidae
Araneomorphae genera
Taxa named by Pekka T. Lehtinen